Ratz may refer to:
 Ratz (political party), a defunct political party in Israel which merged into Meretz
 Ratz (TV series), a French-Canadian animated series from Xilam and Tooncan
 Ratz (comic strip), in The Beano
 Erwin Ratz, (1898-1973), an Austrian musicologist and music theorist
 László Rátz, Hungarian mathematics high school teacher
 Mount Ratz, a mountain in Canada
 Rätzsee, a lake in Mecklenburg-Vorpommern, Germany
 Ratz, a 2000 Showtime original film